The Beyhan I Dam is a gravity dam on the Murat River near the town of Beyhan in Palu District, Elazığ Province, Turkey. Construction on the dam began in 2011 and its first generator was commissioned in March 2015, the other three that same year. It is owned by Kalehan Energy Generation.

See also
Upper Kaleköy Dam – under construction upstream

References

Dams in Elazığ Province
Gravity dams
Roller-compacted concrete dams
Dams on the Murat River
Dams completed in 2015
2015 establishments in Turkey
Energy infrastructure completed in 2015
21st-century architecture in Turkey